Neurogenetics is a quarterly peer-reviewed scientific journal covering the field of neurogenetics. It was established in 1997 and is published quarterly by Springer Science+Business Media. The journal publishes review articles, original articles, short communications, and letters to the editors. The editors-in-chief are Ulrich Müller (University of Giessen), Manuel B. Graeber (University of Sydney), and Louis J. Ptáček (University of California, San Francisco).

Abstracting and indexing
The journal is abstracted and indexed in Academic OneFile, Biological Abstracts, BIOSIS Previews, Chemical Abstracts Service, ProQuest databases, Embase, Neuroscience Citation Index, PASCAL, PubMed/MEDLINE, Science Citation Index Expanded, Scopus, and VINITI Database RAS. According to the Journal Citation Reports, the journal has a 2020 impact factor of 2.660.

References

External links 
 

Neuroscience journals
Springer Science+Business Media academic journals
Quarterly journals
Publications established in 1997
English-language journals
Neurology journals
Genetics journals